Girirra also called Gariire is a Cushitic language of Ethiopia. It has extensive borrowing from Somali. Although not mutually intelligible with Somali, it is estimated that around 70% of the Garirra language is made up of Somali loan words. There has not been many studies on the language itself and is often grouped into a small umbrella of the Macro-Somali language family including relatives like: Rendille, Boni, Bayso, and the two dialects of Somali, being Af-Maay, and Af-Maxaa (Standard Somali).

Phonology 
The following are the phonemes found in Girirra:

References

Further reading 

 Mekonnen, Hundie Kumbi. 2015. The Grammar of Girirra (A Lowland East Cushitic Language of Ethiopia). (Doctoral dissertation, Addis Ababa University; xxvii+367pp.)

Omo–Tana languages
Languages of Ethiopia